Dorymyrmex spurius is a species of ant in the genus Dorymyrmex. Described by Santschi in 1929, the species is endemic to Argentina, Brazil, Paraguay and Uruguay.

References

Dorymyrmex
Hymenoptera of South America
Insects described in 1929